Mordellistena varietas is a species of beetle in the family Mordellidae. It was described in 1937 by Eugene Ray from Puerto Rico.

This beetle measures  in length, or  when including the anal stylus.

References

varietas
Beetles of North America
Insects of Puerto Rico
Endemic fauna of Puerto Rico
Beetles described in 1937